Canada competed at the 2022 Winter Olympics. The 2022 Winter Olympics were held in Beijing, China, from 4 to 20 February 2022. Canada has competed at all 24 editions of the Winter Olympics.

On November 17, 2020, two-time Olympic gold medallist in speed skating Catriona Le May Doan was named as chef de mission of the delegation.

The Canadian team consisted of 215 athletes (109 men and 106 women) competing in 14 sports. Canada will not have any representation in the sport of nordic combined. This will be the third largest Canadian Winter Olympic team after 2014 (222 athletes) and 2018 (225 athletes). The full delegation consisted of 414 people including athletes, coaches, officials and staff.

On February 2, 2022, short track speed skater Charles Hamelin and hockey player Marie-Philip Poulin were named as Canada's flagbearers during the opening ceremony. Meanwhile triple medallist speed skater Isabelle Weidemann was named as the closing ceremony flagbearer.

The Canadian team won 26 medals, tied with 2010 for the second highest total in history. The four gold medals won represented the lowest total since 1994, and meant the country finished outside the top ten of the medal table for the first time since 1988, a span of 34 years. However, The CEO of the Canadian Olympic Committee David Shoemaker was, "completely satisfied with that performance".

Political boycott

On December 8, 2021, Canadian Prime Minister Justin Trudeau announced a diplomatic boycott of the games citing human rights concerns. Trudeau said that the government is "extremely concerned by the repeated human rights violations carried out by the Chinese government". The Canadian Olympic Committee and the Canadian Paralympic Committee, respected the government's decision, but stressed that a full boycott would have hurt athletes.

Medallists
The following Canadian competitors won medals at the games. In the by discipline sections below, medallists' names are bolded.

Multiple medallists
A total of six Canadian athletes across three sports won multiple medals each. Speed skater Isabelle Weidemann became the first to three medals after winning the gold medal in the women's team pursuit event. Weidemann would later be joined by short track speed skater Steven Dubois, who won a gold medal as part of the 5000 metres relay. Snowboarders Max Parrot, Éliot Grondin and Meryeta O'Dine each won two medals. Speed skater Ivanie Blondin was the last Canadian to earn multiple medallists after winning a silver medal in the mass start event on the penultimate day of competition.

Competitors
The following is the list of number of competitors at the Games per sport/discipline.

Alpine skiing

Canada qualified five male and eight female alpine skiers, for a total of 13. The team was officially named on January 21, 2022. Canada also qualified for the mixed team event by being ranked in the top 16 in the Nations Cup standings.

Men

Women

Mixed

Biathlon

Canada qualified eight biathletes (four per gender). Canada's team of eight biathletes was named on January 19, 2022.

Men

Women

Mixed

Bobsleigh

Canada qualified 18 athletes (12 men and six women) along with the maximum number of sleds (three each in two-man, four-man and two-women, along with two monobobs). The team was officially named on January 20, 2022.

Men

* – Denotes the driver of each sled

Women

* – Denotes the driver of each sled

Cross-country skiing

Canada qualified nine cross-country skiers (four men and five women). The first seven athletes were named on January 13, 2022. All three men and Katherine Stewart-Jones prequalified for the team based on World Cup circuit. The other three skiers qualified for the team based on results at the National Cross Country Ski Trials held in Canmore, Alberta between January 6 and 11, 2022. On January 21, 2022, it was confirmed the International Ski Federation (FIS) reallocated two additionals quota spots to Canada, allowing Rémi Drolet and Olivia Bouffard-Nesbitt to be named to the team.

Distance
Men

 The event was shortened to 28.4 km due to high winds and freezing temperatures.

Women

Sprint
Men

Women

Curling

Canada qualified the maximum total of twelve curlers, six men and six women. The men's and women's teams were officially nominated to the team on November 29, 2021. The mixed doubles pair were officially nominated on January 13, 2022. Canada would only go onto win a bronze medal, in the men's competition.

Summary

Men's tournament

Canada qualified their men's team (five athletes), by finishing in the top six teams in the 2021 World Men's Curling Championship. Team Brad Gushue, the 2006 Olympic champion, qualified as the Canadian representatives by winning the 2021 Canadian Olympic Curling Trials, defeating Brad Jacobs 4–3 in the final.

Round robin
Canada had a bye in draws 3, 7 and 11.

Draw 1
Wednesday, 9 February, 20:05

Draw 2
Thursday, 10 February, 14:05

Draw 4
Friday, 11 February, 20:05

Draw 5
Saturday, 12 February, 14:05

Draw 6
Sunday, 13 February, 9:05

Draw 8
Monday, 14 February, 14:05

Draw 9
Tuesday, 15 February, 9:05

Draw 10
Tuesday, 15 February, 20:05

Draw 12
Thursday, 17 February, 9:05

Semifinal
Thursday, 17 February, 20:05

Bronze medal game
Friday, 18 February, 14:05

Women's tournament

Canada qualified their women's team (five athletes), by finishing in the top six teams in the 2021 World Women's Curling Championship. Team Jennifer Jones, the 2014 Olympic champion, qualified as Canadian representatives by winning the 2021 Canadian Olympic Curling Trials, defeating Tracy Fleury 6–5 in the final.

Round robin
Canada had a bye in draws 1, 5 and 9.

Draw 2
Thursday, 10 February, 20:05

Draw 3
Friday, 11 February, 14:05

Draw 4
Saturday, 12 February, 9:05

Draw 6
Sunday, 13 February, 14:05

Draw 7
Monday, 14 February, 9:05

Draw 8
Monday, 14 February, 20:05

Draw 10
Wednesday, 16 February, 9:05

Draw 11
Wednesday, 16 February, 20:05

Draw 12
Thursday, 17 February, 14:05

Mixed doubles tournament

Canada qualified their mixed doubles team (two athletes), by finishing in the top seven teams in the 2021 World Mixed Doubles Curling Championship. On 13 January 2022, Rachel Homan and John Morris were chosen to represent Canada following the cancellation of the 2022 Canadian Mixed Doubles Curling Olympic Trials.

Round robin
Canada had a bye in draws 1, 3, 7 and 10.

Draw 2
Thursday, 3 February, 9:05

Draw 4
Thursday, 3 February, 20:05

Draw 5
Friday, 4 February, 8:35

Draw 6
Friday, 4 February, 13:35

Draw 8
Saturday, 5 February, 14:05

Draw 9
Saturday, 5 February, 20:05

Draw 11
Sunday, 6 February, 14:05

Draw 12
Sunday, 6 February, 20:05

Draw 13
Monday, 7 February, 9:05

Figure skating

Canada qualified a total of 13 figure skaters (seven men and six women). At the 2021 World Figure Skating Championships in Stockholm, Sweden, Canada qualified one entry in the men's and women's singles. In the pairs event, Canada qualified two entries (four athletes), and in the ice dance three entries (six athletes). Later in 2021, at the 2021 CS Nebelhorn Trophy in Oberstdorf, Germany, Canada qualified an additional berth in the men's singles. The final team of 13 athletes was named on January 9, 2021, after the conclusion of the 2022 Canadian Figure Skating Championships.

Singles

Mixed

Team event

Freestyle skiing 

Canada qualified the maximum quota of 16 male and 16 female freestyle skiers. On January 21, 2022, the ski cross team of eight athletes was named. The rest of the team was named on January 24, 2022.

Aerials
Individual

Mixed

Freeskiing
Men

Women
Elena Gaskell withdrew from the big air event after sustaining an injury in training.

Moguls

Ski cross
Men

Women

Qualification legend: FA – Qualify to medal round; FB – Qualify to consolation round

Ice hockey

Canada qualified 25 male and 23 female competitors in hockey, for a total of 48 athletes.

Summary

Men's tournament

Canada men's national ice hockey team qualified by being ranked 1st in the 2019 IIHF World Rankings.

Roster

Group A

Qualification playoff

Quarterfinal

Women's tournament

Canada women's national ice hockey team qualified by being ranked 2nd in the 2020 IIHF World Rankings.

Roster

Group A

Quarterfinals

Semifinals

Gold medal game

Luge 

Canada qualified a total of six lugers. Canada qualified one men's and three women's entries as well as a men's doubles entry over the course of the 2021–22 Luge World Cup. Qualifying at least one sled in each discipline also qualified Canada for the team relay. The team was officially named on January 18, 2022.

Mixed relay

Short track speed skating

Canada qualified all three relays and the maximum of five athletes in each gender. The team was officially named on January 18, 2022. Three of the skaters (Hamelin, Dion and Boutin) were the only athletes with Olympic experience prior to the games.

Men
{|class=wikitable style=font-size:90%;text-align:center
|-
!rowspan=2|Athlete
!rowspan=2|Event
!colspan=2|Heat
!colspan=2|Quarterfinal
!colspan=2|Semifinal
!colspan=2|Final
|-style=font-size:95%
!Time
!Rank
!Time
!Rank
!Time
!Rank
!Time
!Rank
|-
|align=left|Steven Dubois
|align=left rowspan=3|500 m
|40.399
|1 Q
|40.494
|2 Q
|40.825
|4 ADV A
|40.669
|
|-
|align=left|Maxime Laoun
|colspan=2|
|colspan=5|Did not advance
|28
|-
|align=left|Jordan Pierre-Gilles
|40.488
|2 Q
|colspan=2|
|colspan=3|Did not advance
|18
|-
|align=left|Pascal Dion
|align=left rowspan=2|1000 m
|1:24.711
|2 Q
|colspan=2|
|colspan=3|Did not advance
|12
|-
|align=left|Jordan Pierre-Gilles
|1:24.067
|2 Q
|colspan=2|
|colspan=3|Did not advance
|16
|-
|align=left|Pascal Dion
|align=left rowspan=3|1500 m
|colspan=2 rowspan=3 
|2:09.723
|2 Q
|2:15.271
|7
|Did not advance
|18
|-
|align=left|Steven Dubois
|2:15.123
|3 Q
|2:38.000
|6 ADV A
|2:09.254
|
|-
|align=left|Charles Hamelin
|2:11.239
|1 Q
|colspan=2|
|Did not advance
|19
|-
|align=left|Pascal DionSteven DuboisJordan Pierre-GillesCharles HamelinMaxime Laoun*
|align=left|5000 m relay
|colspan=4 
|6:38.752
|1 FA|6:41.257
|
|}
Qualification legend: Q - Qualify based on position in heat; q - Qualify based on time in field; FA - Qualify to medal final; ADV A - Advanced to medal final on referee decision; FB - Qualify to consolation final
* - Athlete skated in a preliminary round but not the final.WomenQualification legend: Q - Qualify based on position in heat; q - Qualify based on time in field; FA - Qualify to medal final; FB - Qualify to consolation final; ADV - Advanced on referee decisionMixedQualification legend: Q - Qualify based on position in heat; q - Qualify based on time in field; FA - Qualify to medal final; FB - Qualify to consolation final
* - Athlete skated in a preliminary round but not the final.

Skeleton

Canada qualified three athletes in skeleton (one male and two female). The team was officially named on January 20, 2022.

 Ski jumping 

Canada qualified four ski jumpers, two males and two females. The Canadian team was named on January 21, 2022. On February 7, Canada won the bronze medal in the mixed team competition, the first ever ski jumping medal for the country at the Winter Olympics.

Snowboarding

Canada qualified a total of 23 snowboarders (11 men and 12 women). 19 snowboarders (nine men and 10 women) were named as part of the team on 19 January 2022. After an internal appeal process, four alpine snowboarders were added to the team (Beaulieu, Buck, Hawkrigg and Lefebvre). Jasey-Jay Anderson, who competed all six prior editions of the parallel giant slalom event, was not named to the team. Derek Livingston, who was originally named to the team, was replaced by Liam Gill due to an injury sustained in training. On Day 3 (February 7th), Max Parrot won the gold medal in the slopestyle event, marking Canada's first gold medal of the Games.AlpineFreestyleMenWomenSnowboard crossMixedQualification legend: Q - Qualify to next round; FA - Qualify to medal final; FB - Qualify to consolation final

Speed skating

Canada qualified 16 athletes (eight per gender) through the 2021–22 ISU Speed Skating World Cup. Canada's team was officially announced on January 17, 2022.

Isabelle Weidemann won Canada's first medal of the games, a bronze, in the Women's 3000 metres event. On February 9, Ivanie Blondin withdrew from the 5000 metres event to focus on the team pursuit event.DistanceMenWomenMass startTeam pursuit'''

Qualification legend: Q - Qualify to the next round; FA - Qualify to the gold medal final; FB - Qualify to the bronze medal final; FC - Qualify to the 5th place final; FD - Qualify to the 7th place final

See also
Canada at the 2022 Winter Paralympics
Canada at the 2022 Commonwealth Games

References

Nations at the 2022 Winter Olympics
2022
2022 in Canadian sports